Skarzyn may refer to the following places in Poland:
Skarzyn, Masovian Voivodeship
Skarżyń, Greater Poland Voivodeship
Skarżyn, Greater Poland Voivodeship
Skarżyn, Łódź Voivodeship
Skarżyn, Ostrołęka County, Masovian Voivodeship
Skarżyn, Siedlce County, Masovian Voivodeship
Skarżyn, Węgrów County, Masovian Voivodeship
Skarżyn, Warmian-Masurian Voivodeship